Julie E. French served as a Democratic Party member of the Montana House of Representatives, representing District 36 from 2007 to 2011.

External links
Biography at Ballotpedia
Montana House of Representatives - Julie French official MT State Legislature website
Project Vote Smart - Representative Julie French (MT) profile

Democratic Party members of the Montana House of Representatives
Living people
Women state legislators in Montana
People from Scobey, Montana
Year of birth missing (living people)
21st-century American women